Lee Sang-yoon (born August 15, 1981) is a South Korean actor. He is best known for his starring roles in My Daughter Seo-young (2012), Angel Eyes (2014), Liar Game (2014), On the Way to the Airport (2016), Whisper (2017), About Time (2018), VIP (2019), and One the Woman (2021).

Career
Lee Sang-yoon was picked out of a crowd on the streets of Yeouido by his former agency director at the age of 24. Making his entertainment debut in 2005 in a Hite Beer commercial, he went on to star in several television series. He won Best New Actor at the 2010 MBC Drama Awards for Home Sweet Home.

Lee earned recognition with his role in the family weekend drama  My Daughter Seo-young (2012), which recorded a peak viewership rating of 47.6%, making it the highest rated Korean drama of 2013.

Lee returned to the screen with period drama Goddess of Fire, playing Prince Gwanghae.

Lee starred in his first big screen leading role in the 2014 romance film Santa Barbara. The same year, he also played lead roles in the medical drama Angel Eyes and mystery thriller series Liar Game.

In 2015, Lee starred in romantic comedy series Second 20s.

In 2016, Lee starred in romance melodrama On the Way to the Airport. He had his second big screen leading role in the thriller film Insane.

In 2017, Lee starred in SBS' legal drama Whisper, playing an elite judge. In December, Lee confirmed to appear in the variety show Master in the House as a fixed cast member.

In 2018, Lee starred in the fantasy melodrama About Time alongside Lee Sung-kyung.

In 2019, Lee starred in an office mystery drama VIP, starring alongside Jang Na-ra. The show went on to gain high viewership numbers and earned Lee the 2019 SBS Drama Award for Excellent Actor.

In 2020, Lee made his silver screen comeback with the action comedy Okay Madam where he played a charismatic North Korean spy who hijacks an airplane. Lee also made his live stage debut as the main lead of The Last Sesson, a philosophical play based on Mark St. Germain's 2010 broadway hit that deals with discussions of the meaning of life. After stepping down from his fixed cast role in Master in the House, Lee went on to join the variety basketball show, Handsome Tigers, in which he became team captain for a celebrity basketball team.

In 2021, Lee starred in the SBS drama One the Woman with Lee Hanee Jin Seo-yeon and Lee Won-keun. The show was another hit series and he earned his first top excellence award in 2021 SBS Drama Awards throughout his career.

In 2022, Lee returns to the theater with the musical The Last Session, his second performance since 2020.

Personal life 
In 2013, Lee graduated from the prestigious Seoul National University with a degree in Physics. He had entered as a freshman in 2000, but his acting career and mandatory military service had caused him to take several years of leave from SNU, resulting in his delayed graduation.

Filmography

Film

Television series

Web series

Television show

Theatre

Awards and nominations

References

External links

 
 
 

1981 births
Living people
South Korean male television actors
South Korean male film actors
Seoul National University alumni